Houston/Trinity Gardens is an African-American neighborhood in Houston.

History
The Subsistence Homesteads Division of the Interior Department, a program of the New Deal, developed Houston Gardens for the purpose of giving poor and landless people the opportunity to become homeowners. Houston Gardens was the only such community developed in Greater Houston. The City of Houston annexed it in the 1940s.

Cityscape
Rafael Longoria and Susan Rogers of the Rice Design Alliance said that Houston Gardens could be described as "rurban," a word coined in 1918 which describes an area with a mix of urban and rural characteristics. The layout of Houston Gardens consists of a large oval parceled on its ends into plots of land shaped like pies. Longoria and Rogers said that "this unique plan is easy to spot on a Houston map."

Demographics
In 2015 the City of Houston Trinity/Houston Gardens Super Neighborhood had 15,798 residents. 67% were non-Hispanic black, 30% were Hispanic, 2% were non-Hispanic white, and 1% were non-Hispanic others. The percentage of non-Hispanic Asians was zero. In 2000 the super neighborhood had 18,054 residents. 81% were non-Hispanic black, 16% were Hispanic, 2% were non-Hispanic white, and 1% were non-Hispanic others. The percentage of non-Hispanic Asians was zero.

Government and infrastructure
Houston Gardens is in Houston City Council District B.

Harris Health System (formerly Harris County Hospital District) designated Settegast Health Center for ZIP code 77028. The nearest public hospital is Lyndon B. Johnson Hospital in northeast Houston.

Education
Houston Gardens is within the Houston Independent School District.

Residents are zoned to Ernest McGowen Sr. Elementary School (previously Houston Gardens Elementary School), Key Middle School, and Kashmere High School.

Parks and recreation
The City of Houston operates the Houston Gardens Park.

References

Neighborhoods in Houston
New Deal subsistence homestead communities
New Deal in Texas